The 2015–16 Odense Boldklub season was the teams' 127th football season since formation. They ended 7th in the Danish Superliga and were knocked out in the third round of DBU Pokalen.

Pre-season and friendlies
OB did precede their 2015–16 campaign with a local tour of 2 exhibition matches on Funen, including a training camp in Sweden, with friendlies against Nottingham Forest and Ängelholms.

First team

Last updated on 17 February 2016

Transfers and loans

Transfers in

a = Market value

Transfers out

Competitions

Danish Superliga

League table

Matches

Results summary

Result by round

DBU Pokalen

Squad statistics

Goalscorers
Includes all competitive matches. The list is sorted by shirt number when total goals are equal.
Last updated on 8 May 2016

Disciplinary record

References 

Odense Boldklub season
Odense Boldklub seasons